Turbonilla boisselierae is a species of sea snail, a marine gastropod mollusk in the family Pyramidellidae, the pyrams and their allies.

References

External links
 Encyclopedia of Life
 World Register of Marine Species

boisselierae
Gastropods described in 2010